2016 Kazakhstan Super Cup was a Kazakhstan football match that was played on 8 March 2016 between the champions of 2015 Kazakhstan Premier League, Astana, and the winner of the 2015 Kazakhstan Cup, Kairat.

This match was played on 8 March at the Astana Arena. Main and extra time of the match ended with goalless draw, and Kairat won the 2016 Kazakhstan Super Cup by a penalty shootout (5:4).

Match details

See also
2015 Kazakhstan Premier League
2015 Kazakhstan Cup

References

FC Astana matches
FC Kairat matches
2016
Supercup
March 2016 sports events in Asia
Association football penalty shoot-outs